Jacob Bergsland (13 August 1890 – 7 September 1974) was a Norwegian épée and foil fencer. He competed in three event at the 1928 Summer Olympics.

References

External links
 

1890 births
1974 deaths
Norwegian male épée fencers
Olympic fencers of Norway
Fencers at the 1928 Summer Olympics
Sportspeople from Oslo
Norwegian male foil fencers
20th-century Norwegian people